Central Avenue station may refer to:

 Central Avenue (BMT Myrtle Avenue Line), a subway station in New York City, in Brooklyn
 Central Avenue station (MBTA) in Boston, Massachusetts
 Campbell/Central Avenue station, in Phoenix, Arizona
 Central Avenue/Camelback station, in Phoenix, Arizona
 Roosevelt/Central Avenue station, in Phoenix, Arizona